Aerospace architecture is broadly defined to encompass architectural design of non-habitable and habitable structures and living and working environments in aerospace-related facilities, habitats, and vehicles. These environments include, but are not limited to: science platform aircraft and aircraft-deployable systems; space vehicles, space stations, habitats and lunar and planetary surface construction bases; and Earth-based control, experiment, launch, logistics, payload, simulation and test facilities. Earth analogs to space applications may include Antarctic, desert, high altitude, underground, undersea environments and closed ecological systems.

The American Institute of Aeronautics and Astronautics (AIAA) Design Engineering Technical Committee (DETC) meets several times a year to discuss policy, education, standards, and practice issues pertaining to aerospace architecture.

The role of Appearance in Aerospace architecture 
"The role of design creates and develops concepts and specifications that seek to simultaneously and synergistically optimize function, production, value and appearance." In connection with, and with respect to, human presence and interactions, appearance is a component of human factors and includes considerations of human characteristics, needs and interests.

Appearance in this context refers to all visual aspects – the statics and dynamics of form(s), color(s), patterns, and textures in respect to all products, systems, services, and experiences. Appearance/esthetics affects humans both psychologically and physiologically and can effect/improving both human efficiency, attitude, and well-being.

In reference to non-habitable design the influence of appearance is minimal if not non-existent. However, as the industry of aerospace continues to rapidly grow, and missions to put humans on Mars and back to the Moon are being announced. The role that appearance/esthetics to maintain crew well-being and health of multi-month or year missions becomes a monumental factor in mission success.

Habitable Structures within Earth's Atmosphere

Appearance/esthetics
Appearance/esthetics in aerospace design must at least co-exist, if not be synergistic, with the overall/societal fundamentals/metrics of aerospace engineering design. These metrics, for atmospheric flight consist of overall/societal factors directed toward productivity, safety, environmental issues such as noise/emissions and accessibly/ affordability. Furthermore, technological parameters such as space, weight and drag minimization and propulsion efficiency highly dictate and restrain the boundaries of appearance/esthetic design. Major factors that need to be considered in atmospheric flight design include producibility, maintainability, reliability, flyability, inspectability, flexibility, repairability, operability, durability, and airport compatibility.

Habitable Structures outside of Low-Earth Orbit (LEO)
What is different concerning space in reference to human-centered design thinking is the nearly complete lack of human presence. Human-centered design influence wholly operates within the context of human interactions; how operations/ missions are run (operability) or how products, systems, services, or experiences (PSSE's) affect end users (usability). Currently the human presence involves the space station and the relatively few international rocket systems.

Human-Centered Design
Due to the large space boom and technological advancements, over the past decade numerous countries and companies have released statements that human expeditions to our solar system are far from done. With long duration confinement in limited interior space in micro-g with little-to-no real variability in environment, attention towards user [crew] subjects well-being, and mental alertness will pose complex human-centered design issues. Mars transit vehicles and surface habitats will constitute highly confined, technical settings characterized by social, emotional and physical deprivation while affording little opportunity to experience privacy and environmental variation. And esthetic/appearance measures for human exploration will emphasize upon “naturalistic countermeasures” to the innate/multitudinous stresses of such expeditions.

Although human wants, needs, and limitations both physically and mentally need to be evaluated and address when designing for space. Design decisions must at least co-exist, if not be synergistic, with the overall metrics of aerospace engineering design. Ex. The International Space Station Toilet. Human factors and habitability design are important topics for all working and living spaces. For space exploration, they are vital. While human factors and certain habitability issues have been integrated into the design process of crewed spacecraft, there is a crucial need to move from mere survivability to factors that support thriving. As of today, the risk of an incompatible vehicle or habitat design has already been identified by NASA as recognized key risk to human health and performance in space. Habitability and human factors will become even more important determinants for the design of future long-term and commercial space facilities as larger and more diverse groups occupy off-earth habitats.

Past Examples
A study conducted in 1989 (reference 2) found that when given multiple photographs and paintings as potential decoration of the international space station. Test (crew) subjects all individually preferred those with naturalistic, irrespective themes, and a large depth of field. Other examples of human-centered design is using pastel paints on the International Space Station (ISS) to contrast and provide “up/down” cues in micro-g environments or  the concept of dynamically and spatially adjusting lighting color and intensities to conform to daily and even seasonal biorhythms similar to earth to mitigate the societal separation effects experienced in space.

See also
 Airborne observatory
 Atmosphere of Venus
 High Altitude Venus Operational Concept (HAVOC)
 Colonization of Venus
 Floating cities and islands in fiction

References

External links
American Institute of Aeronautics and Astronautics

Design Engineering Technical Committee of the AIAA
Spacearchitect.org
Sasakawa International Center for Space Architecture (SICSA)
MOTHER Aerospace Architecture consultancy
Architecture and Vision, Design Studio specializing on Aerospace Architecture and Technology Transfer
LIQUIFER Systems Group, interdisciplinary design team developing architecture, design and systems for Earth and Space
Synthesis, a fundamental design collaborative with experts from Space Architecture, Engineering and Industrial Design
Earth2Orbit, Satellite & Launch Services, Human Space Systems, Robotic Systems, Infrastructure and High-Tech Facilities, Consulting
The Galactic Suite Space Hotel
Galactic Suite Design Aerospace Architecture and Experiences

Architectural styles
Aerospace engineering
Architecture